Montagnoli is a surname. Notable people with the surname include:

 Alessandro Montagnoli (born 1973), Italian politician
 Leandro Martínez Montagnoli (born 1987), Argentine footballer
  (1926–1994), Argentine footballer